4-Thiouracil is a heterocyclic organic compound having a pyrimidine skeleton. It is a derivative of the nucleobase uracil with a sulfur instead of oxygen in position 4. It is found naturally in the 4-thiouridine nucleotide.

References 

Pyrimidines
Thioureas
Nucleobases